Hughes Creek is a stream in Cape Girardeau County in the U.S. state of Missouri. It is a tributary of Apple Creek.

Hughes Creek has the name of a pioneer citizen.

See also
List of rivers of Missouri

References

Rivers of Cape Girardeau County, Missouri
Rivers of Missouri